Turkey ham is a ready-to-eat, processed meat made from cooked or cured turkey meat, water and other ingredients such as binders. Turkey ham products contain no pork products. Several companies in the United States produce turkey ham and market it under various brand names. It was invented circa 1975 by Jennie-O who first introduced it to consumers that year. Around January 1980, the American Meat Institute tried to ban use of the term "turkey ham" for products that are composed solely of turkey and contain no pork. Turkey ham may also be used as a substitute for bacon where religious restrictions forbid the consumption of pork.

Overview
Turkey ham is a processed meat product made primarily from cooked or cured turkey meat and water, formed into the shape of a ham and often sold pre-sliced. It is a ready-to-eat product that can be consumed cold or heated.

Production
Turkey ham is produced from turkey meat such as cured turkey thigh meat and other meat from the animals, which can be machine-deboned. Contrary to the product's name, turkey ham products do not contain any ham or pork products. Some turkey ham products are manufactured with added water, which adds moisture and weight, and some include binders, which serves to bind the moisture and fat in the meat to improve texture. Turkey ham is sometimes flavored to resemble the flavor of ham. Turkey ham typically has a 5 percent fat content, and some turkey hams are produced as fat-free. Turkey hams are typically produced in two sizes, whole and half-sized.

Some U.S. producers and brands of turkey ham include Butterball, Cargill, Jennie-O, Louis Rich, Norbest and Oscar Mayer.

History

Turkey ham was developed by Jennie-O and was first introduced to American consumers by the company in 1975. Turkey ham was a successful venture for Jennie-O, as the processed meat brought in revenues that were ten times higher compared to those the company realized from unprocessed turkey thighs.

Labeling
Around January 1980, the American Meat Institute (AMI) attempted to ban the use of the term "turkey ham" for products that contain no ham and are entirely composed of turkey, which the AMI described as "flagrant consumer deception". Use of the term "turkey ham" for such products was also opposed by some ham producers in the United States. Circa this time, the U.S. government began requiring turkey ham producers to include the words "cured turkey thigh meat" on turkey ham packaging. In 2010, it was written in the Handbook of Poultry Science and Technology, Secondary Processing that the term "cured turkey thigh meat" always followed the words "turkey ham" on American turkey ham packaging.

Notes

References

External links
 

Poultry dishes
Ham